Cameo Kirby is a 1923 American silent drama film directed by John Ford which starred John Gilbert and Gertrude Olmstead and featuring Jean Arthur in her onscreen debut. It was Ford's first film credited as John Ford instead of Jack Ford. The film is based on a 1908 play by Booth Tarkington and Harry Leon Wilson. The story had been filmed as a silent before in 1914 with Dustin Farnum, who had originated the role on Broadway in 1909. The film was remade as a talking musical film in 1930.

Cast

Preservation
Prints of Cameo Kirby are maintained in the UCLA Film and Television Archive and at the Cinemateca Portuguesa (Portuguese Film Archive), in Lisbon.

References

External links

Cameo Kirby at Virtual History

1923 films
1923 drama films
Silent American drama films
American silent feature films
American black-and-white films
American films based on plays
Films based on works by Booth Tarkington
Films directed by John Ford
Films about gambling
Fox Film films
1920s American films